Gold Series Vol.1 is the comeback album from Master Joe & O.G. Black. It is a collection of the best hits by their duo.

Track listing
 Bailen, Yakien
 Sexolandia (feat. Guanábanas)
 Actúa (feat. Lennox)
 Brochando
 Banshee Robao (feat. Warrionex & Yerai)
 Vamo Allá 2
 Carita De Nena
 Cuantas Gerlas
 Lento
 Gracias Por Crearme
 Señora Porque?
 Presten Atención
 Mientras Tanto (feat. Noriega)
 Este Es Mi Año
 Put Your Hands Up (feat. Yomo)

References

Master Joe & O.G. Black albums
2005 compilation albums